Wood Village is a city in Multnomah County, Oregon, United States. The population was 3,878 at the 2010 census. Despite the name, Wood Village is classified as a city.

History
Wood Village was built as a company town for the Reynolds Aluminum plant in Troutdale; the plant closed in 2000.  The city was also formerly home to a  Merix Corporation plant. It was incorporated by a vote of 156–35, with narrow approval from Fairview voters, on June 18, 1949.

Proposals to consolidate Wood Village with neighboring Fairview and Troutdale were seriously considered in the late 1960s and early 1980s.

The community's new city hall opened in September 2021.

Geography
Among the city's parks is Donald L. Robertson Park.

Demographics

2010 census
At the 2010 census, there were 3,878 people in 1,223 households, including 880 families, in the city. The racial makeup of the city was 62.6% White, 2.0% African American, 2.3% Native American, 3.8% Asian, 0.2% Pacific Islander, 25.0% from other races, and 4.1% from two or more races. Hispanic or Latino of any race were 37.0%.

Of the 1,223 households, 46.4% had children under the age of 18 living with them, 48.4% were married couples living together, 16.3% had a female householder with no husband present, 7.3% had a male householder with no wife present, and 28.0% were non-families. 20.8% of households were one person and 5.3% were one person aged 65 or older. The average household size was 3.11 and the average family size was 3.59.

The median age was 30.7 years. 32.2% of residents were under the age of 18; 8.7% were between the ages of 18 and 24; 29.8% were from 25 to 44; 21.6% were from 45 to 64; and 7.5% were 65 or older. The gender makeup of the city was 50.9% male and 49.1% female.

2000 census
At the 2000 census, there were 2,860 people in 1,014 households, including 701 families, in the city. The population density was 3,004.1 people per square mile (1,162.4/km). There were 1,089 housing units at an average density of 1,143.9 per square mile (442.6/km).  The racial makeup of the city was 81.68% White, 0.56% African American, 1.29% Native American, 1.71% Asian, 0.24% Pacific Islander, 9.86% from other races, and 4.65% from two or more races. Hispanic or Latino of any race were 15.21%.

Of the 1,014 households, 38.6% had children under the age of 18 living with them, 45.9% were married couples living together, 16.8% had a female householder with no husband present, and 30.8% were non-families. 23.9% of households were one person and 6.8% were one person aged 65 or older. The average household size was 2.76 and the average family size was 3.22.

The age distribution was as follows: 28.6% under the age of 18, 10.2% from 18 to 24, 32.8% from 25 to 44, 19.7% from 45 to 64, and 8.6% 65 or older. The median age was 31 years. For every 100 females, there were 102.7 males. For every 100 females age 18 and over, there were 97.2 males.

The median household income was $43,384 and the median family income  was $48,167. Males had a median income of $31,577 versus $25,500 for females. The per capita income for the city was $17,833. About 6.9% of families and 8.3% of the population were below the poverty line, including 7.9% of those under age 18 and 2.9% of those age 65 or over.

Transportation
TriMet serves the city with bus service and connections to light rail.

References

External links
 City of Wood Village
 Entry for Wood Village in the Oregon Blue Book

1951 establishments in Oregon
Cities in Multnomah County, Oregon
Cities in Oregon
Company towns in Oregon
Portland metropolitan area